FAST kinase domain-containing protein 5 (FASTKD5) is a protein that in humans is encoded by the FASTKD5 gene on chromosome 20. This protein is part of the FASTKD family, which is known for regulating the energy balance of mitochondria under stress. FASTKD5 is also required for RNA granules to process precursor mRNAs not flanked by tRNAs.

Structure 

FASTKD5 shares structural characteristics of the FASTKD family, including an amino terminal mitochondrial targeting domain and three C-terminal domains: two FAST kinase-like domains (FAST_1 and FAST_2) and a RNA-binding domain (RAP). The mitochondrial  targeting domain directs FASTKD5 to be imported into the mitochondria. Though the functions of the C-terminal domains are unknown, RAP possibly binds RNA during trans-splicing. This protein forms a 103 kDa protein complex with unidentified proteins.

Function 

As a member of the FASTKD family, FASTKD5 localizes to the mitochondria to modulate their energy balance, especially under conditions of stress. Though ubiquitously expressed in all tissues, FASTKD5 appears more abundantly in skeletal muscle, heart muscle, and other tissues enriched in mitochondria.  FASTKD5 also localizes to RNA granules, membraneless bodies containing mRNAs and associated RNA-binding proteins, where it facilitates posttranscriptional RNA processing. This protein is required for the maturation of precursor mRNAs that are not flanked by tRNAs, and thus cannot be processed by the canonical mRNA maturation pathway.

Clinical significance 

Though the link to FASTKD5 remains uncharacterized, the accumulation of abnormal RNA granules can lead to some neurodegenerative diseases.

Interactions 

FASTKD5 has been shown to interact with:
FASTKD2,
DHX30, and
GRSF1.

References 

Uncharacterized proteins